NGC 6624 is a globular cluster in the constellation Sagittarius. It was discovered on 24 June 1784 by the astronomer William Herschel. It is given an apparent magnitude of 7.6 to 8.5.
Six pulsars are known in NGC 6624. The first of these to be discovered was PSR J1823-3021A. This globular cluster also contains 4U 1820-30, a low-mass X-ray binary with an orbital period of only 11.5 minutes.

NGC 6624 is visible as a hazy spot with a small telescope, and appears as a star-like object with binoculars. Its core appears significantly condensed.

References

 Robert Burnham, Jr, Burnham's Celestial Handbook: An observer's guide to the universe beyond the solar system, vol 3, p. 1557

External links
 
 NGC 6624

Globular clusters
Sagittarius (constellation)
6624
17840624